Rucentra is a genus of beetles in the family Cerambycidae, containing the following species:

 Rucentra celebensis Breuning, 1943
 Rucentra dammermani Schwarzer, 1931
 Rucentra grossepunctata Breuning & de Jong, 1941
 Rucentra melancholica Schwarzer, 1931
 Rucentra ochreopunctata Breuning, 1939
 Rucentra posticata Schwarzer, 1931
 Rucentra punctifrons Breuning, 1940
 Rucentra smetanai Hüdepohl in Hüdepohl & Smetana, 1992
 Rucentra v-signatum Schwarzer, 1931

References

Apomecynini